The following is a list of motorcycle speedway riders who have been part of the Leicester Lions first team in league or cup matches, excluding guest riders, both in the team's original era of 1968-1983, and from the team's revival in 2011.

1968-1983

Geoff Ambrose  1972-1973
Frank Auffret  1972-1975
Ray Bales  1977-1978
Malcolm Ballard  1974
Phil Bass 1978
Mick Bell  1974
Tom Black  1974
David Blackburn  1983
Ernst Bøgh  1976
John Boulger  1968-1973, 1977-1979
Malcolm Brown  1969-1974
Ian Clark  1980-1981
Les Collins  1980-1983
Neil Collins  1982-1983
Colin Cook  1979-1983
Bob Cooper  1974-1975
Mark Courtney  1980-1983
Alan Cowland  1970-1972
Dene Davies  1968
Reidar Eide  1976-1977
Alan Emerson  1976
Lars Ericsson  1978
Mike Farrell  1979-1980
Tony Featherstone 1976
Mark Fiora  1983
Garry Flood  1972
Brian Foote  1968-1973
Bruce Forrester  1969-1975
Adi Funk  1977
Bobby Garrad  1980
Tom Godal  1978-1979
Rolf Gramstad  1980-1981
Derek Harrison  1982
John Hart  1968-1970
Markku Helminen  1977
Robert Henry  1979
Phil Herne  1981-1983
Andrzej Huszcza  1980-1981
Finn Jensen  1981-1983
Dave Jessup  1972-1975
DeWayne Keeter  1969
Mike Lanham  1983
Tom Leadbitter  1968-1971
Neil Leeks  1978
Les Leisk  1977
Brian Leonard  1975
Robert Lightfoot  1980-1983
Tony Lomas  1975-1976
George Major  1968-1969
Steen Mastrup  1983
John McNeill  1977-1979
Colin Meredith  1978
Anders Michanek  1968
Garry Middleton  1977
Roger Mills  1968
Eric Monaghan  1983
Bernd Odermatt  1980
Joe Owen  1982-1983
Tommy Pettersson  1977
Graham Plant  1968-1971
Bolesław Proch  1977
Steve Regeling  1980-1983
Jerzy Rembas  1978
Chris Robins  1977-1978
Malcolm Shakespeare  1971-1973
Pete Smith  1981
Norman Storer  1968-1975
Chris Sully  1978-1980
Mark Summerfield  1982
Grzegorz Szczepanik  1976
Ila Teromaa  1975-1979
Pepe Teromaa  1976-1977
John Titman  1978-1981
Chris Turner  1979
Doug Underwood  1975-1977
Phil Vance  1980-1982
Keith White  1973-1974
Vic White  1968
Ray Wilson  1968-1976

2011 onwards

Hans Andersen  2018
Josh Auty  2015–2017, 2018
Danny Ayres  2017
Henning Bager  2011
Josh Bates  2014, 2017, 2019
Viktor Bergström  2011
Kenneth Bjerre  2018
Lasse Bjerre  2012–2013, 2014
Lewis Blackbird  2012–2013
Ilya Bondarenko  2011
Robert Branford  2013
Lewis Bridger  2015
Krzysztof Buczkowski  2014
Max Clegg  2014
Jamie Courtney  2011
Sergey Darkin  2011
Kevin Doolan  2013
Ryan Douglas  2019
Jason Doyle  2014–2015
Alex Edberg  2013
Linus Eklöf  2012, 2013
Jason Garrity  2011
Kacper Gomólski  2017
Jan Graversen  2011-2013
Richard Hall  2011
Patrick Hougaard  2014, 2016
Kyle Hughes  2012
Magnus Karlsson  2011-2012
Danny King  2017–2018
Nicolai Klindt  2014, 2016
Mads Korneliussen  2014
Todd Kurtz  2018
Simon Lambert  2012, 2015
Joe Lawlor  2019
Ludvig Lindgren  2016
Peter Ljung  2014 
Jari Mäkinen  2012
Sam Masters  2015
Mikkel Michelsen  2015
Connor Mountain  2018, 2019
Kyle Newman  2017–2018
Scott Nicholls  2018, 2019
Simon Nielsen  2012–2013
Kauko Nieminen  2011-2013
Kim Nilsson  2017
John Oliver  2011
Bjarne Pedersen  2015
Ellis Perks  2019
Tom Perry  2014
Krystian Pieszczek  2018
Ty Proctor  2019
Paweł Przedpełski  2017
Erik Riss  2017
Stuart Robson  2018
Adam Roynon  2013
James Sarjeant  2013, 2018
Paul Starke  2016
Simon Stead  2014
Aaron Summers  2016
Richard Sweetman  2011
Piotr Świderski  2015
Jack Thomas  2019
Mathieu Trésarrieu  2011
Sebastian Ułamek  2016
Grzegorz Walasek  2015–2016
Davey Watt  2016
Ricky Wells  2018
Richie Worrall  2019
Szymon Woźniak  2015–2016
Charles Wright  2011, 2018

Notes

References
Jones, Alan (2010) Speedway in Leicester: The Lions Roar, Automedia
Oakes, Peter (1991) The Complete History of the British League, Front Page Books, p. 36-7

Leicester Lions riders
lions